Coleophora acanthabortiva is a moth of the family Coleophoridae. It is endemic to Mongolia.

References

External links

acanthabortiva
Moths described in 2004
Moths of Asia
Endemic fauna of Mongolia